Denis Lima de Assis (born 29 December 1989 in Fortaleza, Ceará, Brazil), commonly known as Denis, is a Brazilian footballer who is currently plays for Mikkelin Palloilijat in Kakkonen.

He is a versatile attacker and can play as a striker.

Club career
On 30 November 2016, Rangers announced on Facebook that they had signed Denis.

On 3 July 2017, Lima moved to Lee Man following Lee & Man Paper's decision to form their own HKPL club.

References

External links

Thefinalball profile

1989 births
Living people
Association football midfielders
Brazilian footballers
Brazilian expatriate footballers
Mikkelin Palloilijat players
FF Jaro players
Hong Kong Rangers FC players
Lee Man FC players
Kakkonen players
Ykkönen players
Veikkausliiga players
Hong Kong Premier League players
Expatriate footballers in Hong Kong
Brazilian expatriate sportspeople in Hong Kong
Expatriate footballers in Finland
Brazilian expatriate sportspeople in Finland
Sportspeople from Fortaleza